Domenico de' Marini (1599-1669) was a Roman Catholic bishop. He was archbishop of Avignon from 1649 to 1669.

References

Archbishops of Avignon
1599 births
1669 deaths